This article lists rulers of Thrace and Dacia, and includes Thracian, Paeonian, Celtic, Dacian, Scythian, Persian or Ancient Greek up to the point of its fall to the Roman Empire, with a few figures from Greek mythology.

Mythological
Haemus, became a mountain Haemus Mons
Thrax, son of Ares
Tegyrios, mortal
Eumolpus, inherited a kingdom from Tegyrios
Tereus, the king that was turned into a hoopoe
Phineus, Phoenician son of Agenor, blind king and seer
Poltys, son of Poseidon
Pyreneus, died trying to harm the Muses
Harpalykos, king of the Amymnaeans
Thoas, founder of Thoana
Mopsus, killed Myrine, an amazon queen
Peirous, a Thracian war leader killed by Thoas the Aetolian
Rhesus of Thrace, died in the Trojan war
Cisseus, father of Theano, the wife of Antenor
Diomedes of Thrace, Giant that ruled over the Bistones
Lycurgus, of the Edoni
Oeagrus, father of Orpheus and Linus
Orpheus of the Cicones
Polymestor of the Bistonians
Zalmoxis of the Getae
Charnabon of the Getae, who came into power when grain was first given to men mentioned by Sophocles
Pyraechmes of the Paeonians
Asteropaios of the Paeonians

Persian

Darius I, Persian Satrapy named Skudra by 516 BC
Darius I, Thrace is resubjucated by Mardonius at 492 BC
Xerxes I, retains Thrace from 486 BC to 479 BC

Tribal kings

Olorus, 5th century BC
Syrmus, king of the Triballi 4th century BC
Bergaios, petty king of Pangaeum
Dromichaetes, of the Getae 300 BC
Langarus, of the Agrianes
Pleuratus, a Thracian or Illyrian king that attacked Tylis 213–208 BC
Diegylis, chieftain of the Caeni extremely bloodthirsty 145 BC
Ziselmius, Diegylis' son
Mostis, of the Caeni, king ~130–90 BC
Abrupolis of the Sapaeans, 2nd century BC
Rabocentus of the Bessi mentioned by Cicero
Cosingas, chieftain and priest of Hera to the tribes of Cebrenii and Sucaeboae
Getas, king of the Edones

Getic and Dacian

 Charnabon, king of the Getae as mentioned by Sophocles in Triptolemus - 5th century BC
 Cothelas, father of Meda of Odessa – 4th century BC 
 Rex Histrianorum, ruler in Histria, mentioned by Trogus Pompeius and Justinus - 339 BC
 Dual – 3rd century BC
 Moskon – 3rd century BC
 Dromichaetes – 3rd century BC
 Zalmodegicus – around 200 BC
 Rhemaxos – around 200 BC
 Rubobostes – around 200 BC
 Zoltes - 200 BC 
 Oroles – 2nd century BC
 Dicomes – 1st century BC
 Rholes – 1st century BC
 Dapyx – 1st century BC
 Zyraxes – 1st century BC
 Burebista – 82–44 BC
 Deceneus – 44 BC - around 27 BC High Priest
Thiamarkos - 1st century BC - 1st century AD, Dacian king (inscription "Basileys Thiamarkos epoiei")
 Cotiso – c. 40 BC - c.9 BC
 Comosicus – 9 BC–30 AD
 Scorilo – c.30–70 AD
 Coson
 Duras – c. 69–87
 Decebalus – 87–106
106 AD, Dacia becomes a province of the Roman Empire conquered by Trajan.
Pieporus, king of Dacian Costoboci – 2nd century AD (inscription)
Tarbus – 2nd century AD. Dio Cassius mentioned him without specifying his origin. Some authors consider a possible Dacian ethnicity

Paeonian

 See: List of Paeonian kings

Celtic rulers in Thrace
Cerethrius
 Critasirus, a Celt
Bathanatos of the Scordisci

Celtic rulers of Tylis in Thrace 
 Comontorius Celtic military commander, first king of Tylis (c. 277 BC-?)
 Orsoaltius (presumed Celtic on the basis of coin types; order uncertain)
 Cersibaulus (presumed Celtic on the basis of coin types; order uncertain)
Cavarus, last king of Tylis; overthrown by the Thracians (?-212 BC)

Macedonian

 Philip II of Macedon, annexed  Thrace, 341–336 BC
 Alexander the Great retains Thrace and suppresses rebellion, 335–323 BC
 Lysimachus, one of the Diadochi, includes Thrace in his kingdom, 323–281 BC
 Philip V of Macedon controls all cities of Thrace up to the hellespont, 238–179 BC
 Perseus of Macedon continues controlling the part of Thrace his father left him, 212–166 BC

Odrysian Kingdom

The list below includes the known Odrysian kings of Thrace, but much of it is conjectural, based on incomplete sources, and the varying interpretation of ongoing numismatic and archaeological discoveries. Various other Thracian kings (some of them non-Odrysian) are included as well. Odrysian kings though called Kings of Thrace never exercised sovereignty over all of Thrace. Control varied according to tribal relationships.
Odrysian kings (names are presented in Latin forms):
 Teres I, son of ? Odryses, (480/450/430 BC)
 Sparatocus, son of Teres I (c. 465?-by 431 BC)
 Sitalces, son of Teres I (by 431-424 BC)
 Seuthes I, son of Sparatocus (424-396 BC)
 Maesades, father of Seuthes II, local ruler in eastern Thrace?
 Teres II, local ruler in eastern Thrace
 Saratocus (= Sadocus, son of Sitalces?), local ruler in western Thrace?
 Metocus (= Amadocus I?), son of ? Sitalces
 Amadocus I, son of ? Metocus (unless identical to him) or of Sitalces (by 405-after 390 BC)
 Seuthes II, son of Maesades, descendant of Teres I, local ruler in eastern Thrace (by 405?-after 387 BC) 
 Hebryzelmis, son or brother of ? Seuthes I (c. 386 BC)
 Cotys I, son of ? Seuthes I or Seuthes II (by 384–360 or 359 BC)
 Cersobleptes, son of Cotys I, king in eastern Thrace (360 or 359-341 BC)
 Berisades, rival of Cersobleptes, king in western Thrace in Strimos (359-352 BC)
 Amadocus II, son of Amadocus I and rival of Cersobleptes, king in central Thrace in Chersonese and Maroneia (359-351 BC)
 Cetriporis, son of Berisades, king in western Thrace in Strimos (358-347 BC)
 Teres III, son of ? Amadocus II, king in central Thrace in Chersonese and Maroneia (351-342 BC)
 The kings of Thrace are forced to submit to Macedonian rule or overlordship by 341 BC
 Seuthes III, son of ? Teres III or Cotys I, opposed Macedonian rule (by 324–after 312 BC)
 The succession to Seuthes III is unclear; the area was partitioned among Thracian dynasts and Macedonian kings, after 277 also by the Celts of Tylis

Odrysian rulers in eastern Thrace (hypothetical reconstruction) 
 Cotys II, son of Seuthes (III?) (attested 330 BC, while still prince, if son of Seuthes III?)
 Rhaezdus (Rhoegus?), son of ? Cotys II
 Cotys III, son of Rhaezdus (c. 270 BC)
 Rhescuporis I, son of Cotys III (?-by 212 BC?)

Odrysian rulers originally in inner Thrace (hypothetical reconstruction) 
 Teres IV, son of Seuthes (III?) (c. 295 BC?)
 Seuthes IV, son of Teres (IV?)
 Teres V, son of ? Seuthes IV (c. 255 BC)
 Rhoegus, son of Seuthes (IV?) (mid-Third Century, buried in the Thracian Tomb of Kazanlak)
 Seuthes V, son of ? Rhoegus
 Amadocus III, son of ? Seuthes V (c. 184 BC)
 Cotys IV, son of Seuthes V (by 171-after 166)
 Teres VI, son of ? Amadocus III (c. 148 BC)
 Beithys (Bithys), son of Cotys IV (c.146 BC?)
 The line may have continued as the Odryso-Astaean dynasty listed below

Various Thracian local rulers attested in the Third Century BC 
 Spartocus, ruler of Cabyle? (c. 295 BC)
 Scostocus, ruler in southern Thrace near Aenus and Sestus (c. 280-after 273 BC)
 Sadalas, ruler near Messembria (c. 275 BC), descendant of Cotys, Medistas, Taruntinus, and Mopsyestis (order and relationships unknown)
 Odoroes (c. 280-273 BC) (?)
 Adaeus, Thracian or Macedonian ruler near Cypsela (c. 260-c. 240 BC)

Various non-Odrysian rulers in Thrace 
 Abrupolis of the Sapaeans, fought with Antigonid Macedonia (by 197-172 BC)
 Autlesbis of the ? Caeni, fought with Cotys IV as Roman ally (c. 168 BC)
 Diegylis of the Caeni (by 150-after 144 BC)
 Zibelmius of the Caeni, son of Diegylis, murdered (c. 141 BC)
 Sothimus of the ? Maedi, ally of Mithradates VI, invaded Roman Macedonia (c. 89 BC)

Illyrian rulers 
 Pleuratus I ruler near Skodra (before c. 250 BC)
 Agron, son of Pleuratus II (c. 250-230 BC)
 Pinnes, son of Agron (230-212 BC); under regency of stepmother Teuta 230-228 BC and of stepfather Demetrius of Pharos 228-219 BC
 Scerdilaidas, son of Pleuratus I (212-206 BC)
 Pleuratus II, son of Scerdilaidas (associated 212, 206-180 BC)
 Gentius (Genthius), son of Pleuratus II (180-168 BC)
 168 BC Illyria annexed by the Roman Republic

Odryso-Astaean Kingdom 

A possible continuation of the earlier Odrysian monarchy under a line of kings reigning from Bizye (now Vize) in eastern Thrace. 
 Cotys V, son of ? Beithys (?-by 87 BC)
 Sadalas I, son of Cotys V (by 87–after 79 BC)
 Amadocus, Odrysian royal sent to the aid of Sulla at Chaeronea in 86 BC
 Cotys VI, son of Sadalas I (by 57–48 BC)
 Sadalas II, son of Cotys VI (48–42 BC)
 Sadalas III, kinsman of Sadalas II (42-31 BC)
 Cotys VII, son of Sadalas II by Polemocratia (31–18 BC)
 Rhescuporis II (Astaean), son of Cotys VII by daughter of the Sapaean king Cotys II, killed by the Bessi (18–11 BC)
 11 BC Astaean Thrace conferred on Rhescuporis II's maternal uncle, the Sapaean king Rhoemetalces I, by the Roman emperor Augustus, thereby uniting Thrace

Sapaean Kingdom and unified Thrace 

Originally a local power in the Rhodope area of southern Thrace, the Sapaean kings increased in power and influence and, with Roman blessing, found themselves masters of a unified kingdom of Thrace from 11 BC until the Roman annexation in AD 46. 
 Cotys I, son of ? Rhoemetalces, 57?–by 48 BC
 Rhescuporis I, son of Cotys I, by 48 BC–41 BC
 Rhascus, son of Cotys I, associate ruler? c. 42 BC
 Cotys II, son of Rhescuporis I, 42 BC–31 BC
Thrace becomes a unitary client state of Rome in 11 BC
 Rhoemetalces I, son of Cotys II, 31 BC–AD 12 (monarch of all Thrace from 11 BC)
 Rhescuporis II, son of Cotys II, in western Thrace, deposed by the Roman emperor Tiberius I, 12–19
 Cotys III, son of Rhoemetalces I, in eastern Thrace, killed by his uncle Rhescuporis II, 12–19; married Antonia Tryphaena
 Rhoemetalces II, son of Cotys III and Antonia Tryphaena, 19-38
 Antonia Tryphaena – she co-ruled with her son Rhoemetalces II
 The last client rulers of Thrace were Queen Pythodoris II and King Rhoemetalces III. Rhoemetalces III, son of Rhescuporis II, 38-46; married his cousin's daughter Pythodoris II (daughter of Cotys III and Antonia Tryphaena), murdered by wife
 46 annexation by the Roman Empire, by the Roman emperor Claudius I

Scythian
 Spargapeithes, king of the Agathyrsi

See also
Odrysian kingdom
Sapaeans
Paeonia
List of ancient Cities in Thrace
List of ancient tribes in Thrace
List of rulers of Illyria
List of ancient Cities in Illyria
List of ancient tribes in Illyria

Notes

References
The Histories, translated by G. C. Macaulay, Barnes & Noble, Inc., 2004.
 Z. Archibald, The Odrysian kingdom of Thrace, Oxford, 1998.
 P. Delev, "Cotys son of Rhascuporis," in: M. Slavova, N. Šarankov (eds.), Studia Classica Serdicensia V. Monuments and Texts in Antiquity and beyond. Essays for the Centenary of Georgi Mihailov (1915-1991), Sofia, 2016a: 119-129.
 P. Delev, "Za genealogijata na Sapejskata dinastija" in: P. Delev (ed.), Symposion. Studies in memory of prof. Dimitar Popov, Sofia, 2016b: 148-173.
 H. Dessau, "Reges Thraciae qui fuerint imperante Augusto," Ephemeris Epigraphica 9 (1913) 696-706.
 J. Jurukova, Monetite na trakijskite plemena i vladeteli, vol. 1., Sofia, 1992.
 M. Manov, "Dekret na Apolonija s novo datirane," Numizmatika, Sfragistika i Epigrafika 11 (2015) 167-173.
 R. D. Sullivan, Near Eastern Royalty and Rome, 100-30 BC, Toronto, 1990.
 M. Tačeva, Istorija na bălgarskite zemi v drevnostta prez elinističeskata i rimskata epoha, Sofia, 1997.
 S. Topalov, The Odrysian Kingdom from the Late 5th to the Mid-4th C. B.C., Sofia, 1994.
 S. Topalov, Contributions to the Study of the Coinage and History in the Lands of Eastern Thrace from the End of the 4th C. B.C. to the end of the 3rd C. B.C., Sofia, 2001.
 R. Werner, in: W.-D. von Barloewen (ed.), Abriss der Geschichte antiker Randkulturen, Munich, 1961: 83-150, 239-242.

Paeonia (kingdom)
Ancient Thrace

Thrace and Dacia
Ancient Macedonian monarchs

bg:Тракийски владетели
fr:Liste des rois de Thrace
he:מלכי דאקיה